George Payne (c.1685 – 23 January 1757) was an English official of the Exchequer and Freemason.

Life
He was the son of Samuel Payne of Chester and Frances Kendrick or Kenrick. He was appointed Secretary to the Tax Office 20 July 1732, Head Secretary 8 April 1743

Payne became the second Grand Master of the Premier Grand Lodge of England in 1718. After being succeeded by John Desaguliers in 1719, he was again Grand Master in 1720. During this time he compiled The Constitutions of the Free-masons, which was printed in 1722 or 1723. He was deputy Master in 1725, when the Duke of Richmond was both Master of the Lodge and Grand Master.

Family
Payne and his wife Anne Martha Batson lived in St Stephen's Court, New Palace Yard, Westminster. They were survived by none of their children but adopted his god-daughter and great-niece, Eliza Payne, who married Thomas Lucas then John Julius Angerstein.

Payne's brother Thomas Payne (23 December 1689 – 1744) was rector of Holme Lacy Herefordshire for Frances Scudamore wife of Henry Scudamore, 3rd Duke of Beaufort and later the wife of Charles FitzRoy-Scudamore. Thomas's nine recorded children included Frances Compton (later Amyand) Countess of Northampton and Catherine Seymour, wife of Lord Francis Seymour, Dean of Wells.

Notes

References

Sources
 The First Grand Lodge
 10,000 Famous Freemasons; W R Denslow
 History of the Grand Lodge of England 1723-1760

Freemasons of the Premier Grand Lodge of England
Grand Masters of the Premier Grand Lodge of England
Year of birth uncertain
1757 deaths